Field Ruwe (born 8 August 1955) is an educator, historian, author, and scholar practitioner currently based in Boston, Massachusetts, U.S. In his native country of Zambia, Dr. Ruwe is known as a radio and television host, and entrepreneur. On March 30, 2016, Ruwe signed a book contract with the Oklahoma-based Tate Publishing and Enterprises, LCC for his novel "Crown Jewels." The deal includes Ruwe's future fiction and nonfiction works.

Writings and Education
As well as his radio and television journalism, Ruwe has written for newspapers and has authored books. Using research methods used in journalism, Ruwe has written three novels "Dyeing of Colors", "Alluvial Reflections", "Pearly Gates", and his fourth entitled "Crown Jewels" which is due to be published soon. His first novel "Dyeing of Colors" was published in 2003. His second novel, "Alluvial Reflections", published in 2004, is Ruwe's attempt at thriller. In 2004, Ruwe went on Leave of Absence from Suffolk University to write his third novel "Pearly Gates", published in 2007. In the novel, the jury finds Fisha Bayu guilty and sends him to death row.  Ruwe's latest novel "Crown Jewels" is a sequel in which Fisha Bayu seeks reparations for colonialism.

Ruwe holds a doctorate degree in Education from Northeastern University, Boston, Massachusetts. He was trained as a broadcaster by the British Broadcasting Corporation (BBC) and was educated at the New England Institute of Art and Communications, Suffolk University, Boston, Massachusetts, California State University, Fresno, Fresno Pacific University, Fresno, and Northeastern University, Boston, Massachusetts. He earned a Bachelor of Arts Degree in Mass Communication and Journalism with a major in Broadcast Journalism and a Master's Degree in History. He is a member of the Alpha Delta Pi Society and the Phi Alpha Theta an American honor society for undergraduate and graduates students and professors of history. At California State University, Fresno, he was conferred membership in Kappa Tau Alpha's National Honor Society in Journalism and Mass Communication. In 2006, Ruwe became a member of the Golden Key International Honour Society an organisation that recognizes college students solely on the basis of their academic achievements. Well known honorary members include US President Bill Clinton, General Colin Powell, Astronaut John Glenn and Archbishop Desmond Tutu.

Early life
Ruwe was born in Wusakili Hospital, Kitwe, Zambia, the son of Jeremiah Aaron Ruwe and Rachel Mbizi. He attended Maiteneke Primary School in Chingola. In 1968, he was moved to Chingola Primary School an all-white school. In 1969 he attended high school at Chikola Secondary School, Chingola, and later at Matero Boys' Secondary School in Lusaka where he repeated form V. He was a member of the Chikola Debate Club and the Boys' Brigade. He sang in the Chiwempala Church Choir and the St. Marks Church Choir.

Career
In 1975, he entered broadcasting as a Program Operator for Zambia Broadcasting Services, recording radio programs. The following year, Ruwe devised a television sketch show called Tiyende Pamodzi Comedy Show, based on the BBC format of The Two Ronnies, a comedy show aired on Television Zambia in the early seventies, featuring the double act of Ronnie Barker and Ronnie Corbett.

Ruwe's first time to host a radio show was in 1977 when he took over the presentation of "Sanyo Hit Parade" from Humphrey Mapoma. Known by the listeners as "Captain of the Air," Ruwe featured an eclectic selection of whatever sort of music struck his fancy. He began to get deluged with mail from listeners who asked him to play their favorite songs. So, Ruwe ventured into commercial radio production, getting sponsorship from various companies around the country.

In 1978, Ruwe resigned from ZBS and later moved to Nairobi, Kenya, where he produced a comedy show on the Voice of Kenya television entitled "Come What May," featuring himself as the disastrous-prone 'Dafurao.' The program was a sketch show crossed with a sitcom. It also included a duo of him and Rashpal Panesar reading a spoof of news. It is believed that Ruwe was the first to introduce locally produced English comedy on the Voice of Kenya. Ruwe also performed radio continuity duties, narrated various scripted programs and compiled/presented "Jazz Hour" on the Voice of Kenya.

BBC Club
Ruwe returned to Zambia in 1982. In the same year, he was sponsored by The British Council to study television production at the BBC Open University in Milton Keynes, England and became a member of the BBC Club.

Private sector
Upon completion of the course, he returned home and in 1983 teamed up with Zambia's prolific actress Mathilda Malamamfumu Tutu to form Rutu Advertising Agency. Their immediate hit was "Secretary of the Year" contest, which was launched in August 1984. The contest featured top-flight secretaries drawn from different parts of the country and drew interest from the private sector and parastatal organizations including the Bank of Zambia. In 1985, Ruwe and his partner acquired copies of the movie Love Brewed in an African Pot directed by Ghanaian film maker Akwa Ansah which they showed around the country. In the same year, Ruwe wrote his first book, Have A Good Laugh, a compilation of jokes from different parts of the world.

In 1986, Ruwe and Tutu split. Rutu became Rute Advertising ('te' drawn from his daughter Thembinkosi). Between 1986 and 1990 Ruwe scripted and hosted various radio and television programs which included "Money Matters" by the Bank of Zambia, "The Road" a production of the National Roads Board and the World Bank, "Zamseed Radio Program" by Zambia Seed Company, "DBZ of the Air" by the Development Bank of Zambia, and more than twenty companies under the auspices of INDECO group of companies. Television programs included "The Tourist" by Zambia National Tourist Board, and various sponsored musicals. During the first Zambia Annual Broadcasting Awards Ceremony, held in Lusaka on 29 December 1989, Ruwe was presented "The Best Disc Jockey of the Year" for all radio channels award, thereby being recognized as the best radio DJ in the country.

From 1990 to 1995, Ruwe operated his own car hire (Rute Car Hire) firm with a fleet of eleven cars and one bus. Ruwe was also known to feature at state functions, dinners and weddings as Master of Ceremonies (ringmaster), often bringing humor and fun to the occasion.

Current life
In 2006, Ruwe hosted a radio program called The World at Large, on Valley Public Radio, KVPR FM89.3 Fresno and KPRX FM89.1 Bakersfield, California. The program served as a vehicle to share ideas and possible solutions to the myriad of complex issues facing the world of trade. Between June and October 2006, Ruwe interviewed growers, food processors, manufacturers, importers and exporters. Program participants included corporate CEOs, members of Chamber and Commerce, Professors in Agricultural and Business schools, and US government officials in the trade departments.

In 2008, Ruwe, in league with distinguished scholars, Dr. Miles Ishigaki, professor at Fresno State, and Dr. Robert Marquez, scientist and affiliated New Mexico State University professor, created Africa Center (USA) a non-profit, all-inclusive clearinghouse for philanthropists, donors and sympathizers wishing to help African relief efforts and improve the lives of the displaced, impoverished and diseased in many parts of sub-Saharan Africa.

2011- Ruwe is the author of "Hunt for Successor Series" based on Zambian politics. His article "Hunt for Successor 8: Zambian Intellectuals are Lazy" (retitled 'You Lazy (Intellectual) African Scum!' ) went viral. He is the author of the "Biography of President of Zambia Michael Chilufya Sata." Following the death of the president parts of the article were quoted by the New York Times, and Agence France-Presse (AFP).

Personal life
Dr. Ruwe is married to Dr. Mathilda Bwalya Ruwe a medical doctor and research scientist. He is a father of three children, Thembinkosi, Dalitso (Dr. Dalitso Ruwe) and Rachel, and a grandfather of three, Martin, Zoe and Gabriel.

Newspaper articles by Ruwe
Sanger Herald:
In the line of duty: Sanger born earns purple heart|
Michael Montelongo sworn in as mayor|
Promoting Sanger to Valley radio listeners|
Squaw Valley residents fear private metering|
Seventy years and still going strong: Bill and Florine Kyler are part of Sanger’s history|
New equipment for city playgrounds|
Lower electric bills in your future –City considers options to reduce cost|
Combating speeders – Police will get more tools to slow down speeders|
City borrows DBCP funds to buy truck: Previous loans have been repaid|
 park in Sanger's future: Proposition 84 dollars may be used|

Orange Cove and Mountain Times:
Questions, legalities arise over Orange Cove declaring Emergency status of BMX track|
Public works plan bewildering|
Local fire department and city at odds over funds|

The Fowler Ensign:
Mary-Anne Ward named new postmaster for Fowler Post Office|
In the Spotlight – New church joins Fowler community|
In the Spotlight- Fowler librarian Benjamin Langstraat|

The Reedley Exponent:
Street Faire's 20th Anniversary – First Saturday in May is Reedley tradition|
Mountain residents question cancelled water meeting|
Measure K – Kings Canyon Unified School District $32 million bond|
Measure E – Sierra Kings District Hospital $20 million bond package|

Madera Tribune:
Neighbors and Friends – Loving the thrills of fiction writing – Author Bonnie Hearn Hill|
The women's improvement club|
The Flume: Water transportation system helped economic development|
Water Battle: Fights over Valley’s resource go back to 1860|

Tulare Advance- Register:
It's growth vs. preservation|

Mid-Valley Publishing:
Cities may seek Ag land for future development

References
The Historian (2010) Vol. 71 Number 3., p. 740 Wiley-Blackwell Tampa FL.

Zambia National Broadcasting Corporation (1990) Profile on Radio 4 by Frank Mutubila

Nairobi Times (1980) Everyman's Everyman by Margaretta Wagacheru

Gunda, M. R. & Kugler, J. (2012).The Bible and Politics in Africa (2012) Vol.7 of Bible African Studies. University of Bamberg Press. Pg.170

Njamnjoh, H.M. (2013). Bridging Mobilities: ICTs Appropriation by Cameroonians in South Africa and The Netherlands. Langaa RPCIG, pg 201

Fasua, T. (2011). Crushed!Navigating Africa's Tortuous Quest for Development: Myths and Realities. AuthorHouse

Ruwe, F. (2010). The History of Technology and Innovation: Development of Radio-broadcasting Technology in Africa: The case of former British Colonies, including the former Portuguese colony of Mozambique. Fresno Pacific University, California, U.S.A.

Koloko, L. (2013). Zambian Music Legends. Book-A-Million. Pg 170

External links

 Official Website of Field Ruwe
 https://www.nytimes.com/2014/10/30/world/africa/michael-sata-sharp-tongued-president-of-zambia-dies-at-77.html?_r=0
 UKZambians category columns: Field Ruwe
 Lusaka Times Archives: Articles by Field Ruwe
 Zambian Watchdog Category Archives: Field Ruwe
 Bulawayo24 News Category Archives: Field Ruwe
 East African Standard Decolonizing Ngugi wa Thiongo's Mentality
 The Times of Nigeria Decolonizing Ngugi wa Thiongo's Mentality
 Scribd.com Biography of Michael Chilufya Sata President of Zambia
 The New Times:Rwanda's Leading English Daily Big Lesson from Field Ruwe's Article
 The Zambian Economist Is Zambia Intellectually Blind?
 Mind of Malaka You Lazy Intellectual African Scum
 Allafrica.com You Lazy Intellectual African Scum by Field Ruwe
 African Star News  The Walter Attack on African Intelligentsia
 The Reedley Exponent Improper bidding alleged on Orange Cove BMX park

1955 births
Living people
Zambian novelists
Alumni of the Open University
Zambian journalists
People from Kitwe
Suffolk University alumni
California State University, Fresno alumni
Fresno Pacific University alumni
21st-century novelists
Zambian television personalities
Zambian writers
21st-century Zambian writers